Before the Acts of Union 1707, the barons of the shire of Stirling elected commissioners to represent them in the unicameral Parliament of Scotland and in the Convention of the Estates.

From 1708 Stirlingshire was represented by one Member of Parliament in the House of Commons of Great Britain.

List of shire commissioners

 1612: Alexander Seton of Kilcreuch
 1644: Sir Thomas Nicolson of Carnock
 1648: Laird of Polmala (Murray)
 1648: Laird of Garden (Stirling)  
 1649: Sir James Hope of Keir  
 1649–50: Sir James Hope of Hopton  
 1649–50: George Buchanan of that Ilk  
 1650: Sir Charles Erskine  
 1661–63: John Murray of Touchedame and Polmais 
 1661: James Livingstone, 1st Viscount Kilsyth (died 1661) 
 1662–63: John Buchanan of that Ilk  
 1665 convention: William Murray of Donypace
 1665 convention, 1667 convention, 1669–72: James Seton the elder of Touch
 1667 convention: Charles Erskine of Alvey  
 1669–74, 1678 (convention): Sir John Stirling of Keir 
 1674, 1678 (convention), 1681–82, 1685–86: James Seton the younger of Touch 
 1681–82: Richard Elphinstone of Airth 
 1685–86:  William Livingstone of Kilsyth 
 1689 convention, 1689–90: Sir Charles Erskine of Alva (died 1690)
 1689 convention, 1689–1701: Sir John Houston of that Ilk
 1690–1701: Alexander Monro of Bearcrofts 
 1690–1700: Alexander Napier of Culcreuch (expelled 1700) 
 1700-1701: Sir John Schaw, Bt of Greenock (terminated 1701–2) 
 1702: William Livingstone of Kilsyth   
 1702–1707: John Grahame of Killearne  
 1702–1707: James Grahame of Buchlyvie   
 1702–1707: Robert Rollo of Powhouse

References

See also
 List of constituencies in the Parliament of Scotland at the time of the Union

Shires represented in the Parliament of Scotland (to 1707)
Constituencies disestablished in 1707
1707 disestablishments in Scotland